When the Cat's Away may refer to:

 When the Cat's Away (1929 film), a Mickey Mouse short cartoon
 When the Cat's Away (1996 film), a French drama directed by Cédric Klapisch
 When the Cat's Away (band), a New Zealand female vocal group.
 When the Cat's Away (album), a live album from When the Cat's Away (band) (1987)
 "When the Cat's Away" (The Brothers Garcia), an episode of The Brothers Garcia
 "When the Cat's Away" (Desmond's), an episode of Desmond's
 "When the Cat's Away" (Romeo!), an episode of Romeo!
 When the Cat's Away, an unproduced screenplay co-written by Cara Buono